The 51st district of the Texas House of Representatives represents a southeast portion of the city of Austin, the capital of Texas, in Travis County. The current Representative is Eddie Rodriguez, who has represented the district since 2003.

Major highway I-35 goes through the northwest portion of the district.

References 

51